Glaenocorisa propinqua is a species in the family Corixidae ("water boatmen"), in the order Hemiptera ("true bugs, cicadas, hoppers, aphids and allies").
The distribution range of Glaenocorisa propinqua includes Europe, Northern Asia (excluding China), and North America. It can be found in lakes, and its distribution is influenced by the presence of fish, which prey upon the larvae.

References

Further reading
 Henry, Thomas J., and Richard C. Froeschner, eds. (1988). Catalog of the Heteroptera, or True Bugs, of Canada and the Continental United States, xix + 958.
 Ross H. Arnett. (2000). American Insects: A Handbook of the Insects of America North of Mexico. CRC Press.
 Thomas J. Henry, Richard C. Froeschner. (1988). Catalog of the Heteroptera, True Bugs of Canada and the Continental United States. Brill Academic Publishers.

External links
NCBI Taxonomy Browser, Glaenocorisa propinqua

Corixidae
Insects described in 1861